Johann Jakob Ebert (born 20 November 1737 in Breslau; died 18 March 1805 in Wittenberg) was an 18th-century German mathematician, astronomer, poet and author.

Life

He was born in Breslau in what was then part of Prussia (now known as Wrocław and in Poland) on 20 November 1737. He was educated in Wurzen in western Saxony then returned to his home town to study at the Elisabeth Gymnasium.

In 1756 he enrolled at the University of Leipzig again in Saxony. He studied Mathematics, Natural Philosophy (Physics) and Moral Philosophy and graduated MA in 1761. Following graduation he lectured in Maths and Philosophy at the university. Here he worked with Christian Gellert and Johann August Ernesti.

In 1764 he began a grand tour of Germany and France. Going to Russia in 1768 he got a post as tutor to the children of Minister Teplof in St. Petersburg. In 1769 he went to the University of Wittenberg in Saxony as a junior professor of Lower Mathematics. He quickly obtained a reputation as a competent teacher.

From 1771 he began publishing newspapers and periodicals in Wittenberg.

On 5 June 1783 he was the first German to fly in a hot air balloon during a visit to Paris, meeting with the Montgolfier Brothers. On return to Wittenberg the subject of aviation entered his lectures. In 1785 he became professor of combined Lower and Higher Mathematics at the University.

In 1789 he built an observatory at his house at 16 Burgermeisterstrasse in Wittenberg.

He died in Wittenberg on 18 March 1805.

Publications
The Beginnings of the Theory of Reason (1773)
Nature for the Young (1777) 
Instruction in the Philosophical and Mathematical Sciences (1779)
Biographies of Strange Creatures from the Animal Kingdom (1784)
Natural History (1784)
The Beginning of the Most Fine Parts of Natural Philosophy (1784)
The Philosopher for Everyone (1786)
Yearbook for Instructive Entertainment for Young Ladies (1795)
Fables for Children and Young People (1810) posthumous

Periodicals
Tapeten 1771 to 1776
Wittenberg Scholarly Newspaper 1778 to 1785
Wittenberg Magazine 1781 to 1784
Wittenberger Weekly Speak 1801 to 1804

References

1737 births
1805 deaths
18th-century German mathematicians
German journalists
German non-fiction writers
People from Wittenberg